Hellas Sat 2 (previously called as Intelsat K-TV, NSS K-TV, NSS 6, Intelsat APR3, and Sinosat 1B) is a communications satellite operated by Hellas Sat. On 29 June 2017, the Hellas Sat 3 satellite was launched to replace the Hellas Sat 2.

Launch 
Hellas Sat 2 was launched by an Atlas V 401 rocket from Cape Canaveral Air Force Station, SLC-41, Florida, United States, at 22:10:00 UTC on 13 May 2003.

Capacity and coverage 
The 3450 kg satellite carries 30 Ku-band transponders to provide direct-to-home voice and video transmissions to much of Europe, North Africa and the Middle East, after parking over 39.0° East longitude. Also provided television broadcasting services for the 2004 Summer Olympic Games in Athens, Greece.

References

External links 
 Hellas Sat

Communications satellites in geostationary orbit
Intelsat satellites
Satellites of Greece
Spacecraft launched in 2003
2003 in Greece
Satellites using the Eurostar bus